Lazar C. Margulies (1895-1982) was a physician who specialized in obstetrics and gynecology. He is best known for developing a type of safe Intrauterine device (IUD) made of plastic.

Biography 
Margulies was born in Galicia, which later became part of Poland. He served in the Austro-Hungarian army in World War I in their medical corps. Margulies completed his studies at the University of Vienna in 1921. He worked in Vienna  from 1929 until 1938. Later, as the Nazi movement spread, he was "expelled from the hospital" because he was Jewish. He fled to Britain in 1940. In 1941 he emigrated to the United States where he settled in New York City. Margulies started working at Mount Sinai Medical Center in 1954.

Margulies was working in the obstetrics department of Mount Sinai in 1958 when he suggested his idea for a new IUD to the head of the department, Alan F. Guttmacher. Margulies has successfully used IUDs in Berlin. Guttmacher approved Margulies' idea to create a safer type of IUD using plastic. Margulies developed a spiral-shaped IUD in 1960. It was made of thermoplastic and introduced in a thin tube and then "expelled with a plastic plunger." After it was expelled, the plastic IUD retained its shape inside the uterus. The method of insertion Margulies developed meant that a woman's cervix did not have to be dilated for the insertion to take place. Margulies' method solved many problems inherent in metallic IUDs. Guttmacher allowed Margulies to do clinical trials which were successful. Margulies presented the clinical results and demonstrated the plastic IUD at the first international symposium on IUDs in New York in 1962. His invention was patented in 1965 and assigned to Mount Sinai by Margulies.

Margulies died in 1982 of a cerebral hemorrhage in Manhattan.

References

Citations

Sources

External links 
 Coil Spring Intra-Uterine Device and Method of Using (patent)

American obstetricians
1982 deaths
1895 births
University of Vienna alumni
Icahn School of Medicine at Mount Sinai faculty
American gynecologists
Birth control activists
Jews from Galicia (Eastern Europe)
20th-century American inventors